Hyde Run is a  long 1st order tributary to Red Clay Creek in New Castle County, Delaware.

Variant names
According to the Geographic Names Information System, it has also been known historically as:  
Clark's Run
Hyde's Run

Course
Hyde Run rises in a pond in Stuyvesant Hills, Delaware on the Mill Creek divide in New Castle County, Delaware.  Hyde Run then flows southeast to meet Red Clay Creek at Faulkland in Brandywine Springs Park.

Watershed
Hyde Run drains  of area, receives about 46.5 in/year of precipitation, has a topographic wetness index of 430.32 and is about 16% forested.

See also
 List of Delaware rivers

References

External links
 Brandywine Springs Park

Rivers of Delaware
Tributaries of the Christina River
Rivers of New Castle County, Delaware